Save, SAVE, or Saved may refer to:

Places
Save (Garonne), a river in southern France 
Save River (Africa), a river in Zimbabwe and Mozambique 
Sava, a river in Eastern Europe also known as Save
Savè, Benin, a commune and city
Save, Govuro District, Mozambique, a posto in Govuro District, Mozambique
Save, Machaze District, Mozambique, a posto and locality in Machaze District, Mozambique
Save, Rwanda, a settlement
Säve, a locality in Göteborg Municipality, Västra Götaland County, Sweden
Säve Airport
 Esquel Airport (ICAO airport code: SAVE; IATA airport code: EQS), Esquel, Chubut Province, Argentina

Organizations, groups, companies
Spirit Airlines (NASDAQ stockticker: SAVE), a U.S. airline

Charities
Society Against Violence in Education, a non-profit organization working against ragging in India
Save Britain's Heritage (SAVE), a historic building conservation group in the United Kingdom
Suicide Awareness Voices of Education, a suicide awareness and prevention charity based in the United States

In technology
Saved game, saved progress of a player in a video game
Computer files are "saved" to achieve persistence

In media and entertainment

Music
Saved (Bob Dylan album), 1980, or the song
Saved (Now, Now album)
Saves (EP), a 2001 EP by Pist.On
"Saved" (Leiber and Stoller song), a song performed by LaVern Baker and Elvis Presley
"Saved." (Maaya Sakamoto song), a song by Maaya Sakamoto
"Saved" (Swans song), 1989
"Saved" (Ty Dolla Sign song), a song by American singer Ty Dolla Sign
"Saved", a song by Kutless from Kutless
"Saved", a song by Labi Siffre from Crying Laughing Loving Lying
"Saved", a song by Snoop Dogg from Bible of Love
"Save", a song by the Rocket Summer from the album Do You Feel
"Save", a song by Tyler Joseph

Screen and stage
Saved (play), a 1965 play by Edward Bond
Saved (TV series), a 2006 television drama
Saved!, a 2004 film
Saved (2009 film), an Australian telemovie
Saved (musical), a musical based on the 2004 film Saved!
Salvados, a news show on Spanish TV

In sports
Save (baseball), when a pitcher finishes a game for the winning team under certain prescribed circumstances
Save (goaltender), when a goalie prevents a goal
Save, a slang term for sacrifice (bridge), a bid made in the hope than the resulting penalty is less than opponents would score by making their contract

Other uses
Salvation, being saved or protected from harm or being saved or delivered from some dire situation
 European Union SAVE Programme on energy conservation
 SAVE-study, a survey about the saving behaviour of German households
 Systematic Alien Verification for Entitlements, a program for government and tribal agencies in the United States to verify immigration documents and status of individuals
 Stop Advertising Victims of Exploitation Act of 2014, a US bill on pornography

See also

Saving